In shogi, Waki System (脇システム waki shisutemu) is a symmetrical Double Fortress (Static Rook) opening.

It is characterized in part by positioning Black's bishop on the 46 square and White's bishop on the 64 square allowing for a bishop exchange.

The strategy is named after Kenji Waki.

Development

An early ...P-74 (as opposed to an early ...G-52) is the most common move leading to the standard 24-Move Fortress Set (矢倉24手組) position, which is one of the major branching points of the set of Fortress substrategies.

13. S-37. The Waki System is a silver-37 branch Fortress substrategy.

13. ...B-64. The Waki System form starts with White moving their bishop to 64 temporarily pinning Black's silver to their rook.

14. B-46. In response, Black opposes White's bishop by moving their own bishop to 46. 

This positioning allows the bishops to be traded off in order to place them in hand.

14. ..S-73

20. P-96

20. P-15 variation

14. ...B-73 variation

...P-14 variation

...P-94 variation

See also

 Fortress opening
 Morishita System
 Spearing the Sparrow
 Akutsu Rapid Attack Yagura
 Central Rook Fortress
 Right Fourth File Rook#Yagura vs Right Fourth File Rook
 Static Rook

Bibliography

 脇謙二『単純明快矢倉・脇システム』毎日コミュニケーションズ、 1994年、

External links

 Shogi Maze: Yagura: Waki System

Shogi openings
Fortress openings